Ghosts is the eighth studio album by English band Strawbs.

Track listing

Side one
"Ghosts" (Dave Cousins) – 8:31
"Sweet Dreams"
"Night Light"
"Guardian Angel"
"Night Light"
"Lemon Pie" (Cousins) – 4:03
"Starshine/Angel Wine" (Chas Cronk) – 5:15
"Where Do You Go (When You Need a Hole to Crawl In)" (Cousins) – 3:02

Side two
"The Life Auction" – 6:52
"Impressions of Southall from the Train" (Cousins, John Hawken)
"The Auction" (Cousins, Dave Lambert)
"Don't Try to Change Me" (Lambert) – 4:28
"Remembering" (Hawken) – 0:54
"You and I (When We Were Young)" (Cousins) – 4:04
"Grace Darling" (Cousins) – 3:55

Bonus track - A&M remastered CD 
"Changes Arrange Us" (Rod Coombes) – 3:55
Rod Coombes sings lead vocals on this track and plays guitar.

Personnel

Dave Cousins – lead vocals, backing vocals, acoustic guitar, electric guitar, recorder
Dave Lambert – lead vocals, backing vocals, acoustic & electric guitar
John Hawken –  piano, electric piano, harpsichord, mellotron, Moog synthesizer, Hammond organ, pipe organ
Chas Cronk – backing vocals, bass guitar, acoustic guitar
Rod Coombes – backing vocals, drums, congas, percussion

Additional personnel
Claire Deniz – cello on "Starshine/Angel Wine"
Robert Kirby - choral arrangements

Recording

Tom Allom – Producer and Engineer
Mick Glossop - assistant engineer

Recorded at The Manor, Kidlington, Oxfordshire; Sound Techniques, London; TPA, London and the chapel of Charterhouse School, Godalming, Surrey

Release history

References

Ghosts on Strawbsweb
Sleeve notes CD 540 937-2 Ghosts

Notes

Strawbs albums
1975 albums
Albums arranged by Robert Kirby
Albums produced by Tom Allom
A&M Records albums